Romain Grégoire Clément Amalfitano (born 27 August 1989) is a French professional footballer who plays as an attacking midfielder for Western Sydney Wanderers. He previously played for Reims, Châteauroux, Evian, Newcastle United, Dijon FCO and Al-Faisaly.

Career

Châteauroux
Born in Nice, he joined the Châteauroux academy, where he played until the end of the 2009 season.

Evian
He began his professional career at Evian, playing in 28 games for them in the 2009–10 Championnat National, where Evian finished as champions.

Reims
He then signed a two-year deal with Stade de Reims, scoring 10 goals in his 58 appearances for the club. The team finished 10th in the 2010–11 Ligue 2 and second in the 2011–12 Ligue 2, winning promotion to Ligue 1.

Newcastle United
On 1 July 2012, Amalfitano signed for Premier League team Newcastle United on a three-year contract. Amalfitano joined Newcastle on a free transfer after his contract at Reims expired on 30 June 2012. He made his club debut in a friendly match that ended in a 1–0 defeat away to 3. Liga club Chemnitzer FC on 13 July. He made his competitive debut for the club in a Europa League tie against Atromitos F.C. on 23 August, which ended with a 1–1 scoreline. Amalfitano made his first start for the club in Madeira when Newcastle played Maritimo in their opening group stage game of the Europa League, the match ended 0–0. He made four appearances in total for Newcastle, all in the Europa League.

Dijon
On 4 September 2013, it was announced that Amalfitano had joined Dijon FCO on loan. On 1 July 2014, he signed a permanent three-year deal with the club on a free transfer.

Al-Faisaly
On 25 October 2020, Amalfitano signed with Saudi Professional League club Al-Faisaly. On 31 January 2022, he was released by Al-Faisaly.

Western Sydney Wanderers
On 4 June 2022, Amalfitano signed with A-League Men club Western Sydney Wanderers.

Personal life
He is the younger brother of Morgan Amalfitano.

Career statistics

Club

Honours

Club
Al-Faisaly
King Cup: 2020–21

References

External links
 
 
 

1989 births
Living people
Footballers from Nice
French footballers
Association football midfielders
Thonon Evian Grand Genève F.C. players
Stade de Reims players
Newcastle United F.C. players
Dijon FCO players
Al-Faisaly FC players
Ligue 1 players
Ligue 2 players
Saudi Professional League players
French expatriate footballers
Expatriate footballers in England
Expatriate footballers in Saudi Arabia
French expatriate sportspeople in England
French expatriate sportspeople in Saudi Arabia
French people of Italian descent